In statistics, Barnard’s test is an exact test used in the analysis of  contingency tables with one margin fixed. Barnard’s tests are really a class of hypothesis tests, also known as unconditional exact tests for two independent binomials. These tests examine the association of two categorical variables and are often a more powerful alternative than Fisher's exact test for  contingency tables. While first published in 1945 by G.A. Barnard, the test did not gain popularity due to the computational difficulty of calculating the  value and Fisher’s specious disapproval. Nowadays, for small / moderate sample sizes  computers can often implement Barnard’s test in a few seconds.

Purpose and scope
Barnard’s test is used to test the independence of rows and columns in a  contingency table. The test assumes each response is independent. Under independence, there are three types of study designs that yield a  table, and Barnard's test applies to the second type.

To distinguish the different types of designs, suppose a researcher is interested in testing whether a treatment quickly heals an infection.
 One possible study design would be to sample 100 infected subjects, and for each subject see if they got the novel treatment or the old, standard, medicine, and see if the infection is still present after a set time. This type of design is common in cross-sectional studies, or ‘field observations’ such as epidemiology.
 Another possible study design would be to give 50 infected subjects the treatment, 50 infected subjects the placebo, and see if the infection is still present after a set time. This type of design is common in clinical trials.
 The final possible study design would be to give 50 infected subjects the treatment, 50 infected subjects the placebo, and stop the experiment once a pre-determined number of subjects has healed from the infection. This type of design is rare, but has the same structure as the lady tasting tea study that led R.A. Fisher to create Fisher's exact test.

Although the results of each design of experiment can be laid out in nearly identical-appearing  tables, their statistics are different, and hence the criteria for a "significant" result are different for each:
 The probability of a  table under the first study design is given by the multinomial distribution; where the total number of samples taken is the only statistical constraint. This is a form of uncontrolled experiment, or "field observation", where experimenter simply "takes the data as it comes".
 The second study design is given by the product of two independent binomial distributions; the totals in one of the margins (either the row totals or the column totals) are constrained by the experimental design, but the totals in other margin are free. This is by far the most common form of experimental design, where the experimenter constrains part of the experiment, say by assigning half of the subjects to be provided with a new medicine and the other half to receive an older, conventional medicine, but has no control over the numbers of individuals in each controlled category who either recover or succumb to the illness.
 The third design is given by the hypergeometric distribution; where both the total numbers in each column and row are constrained. For example an individual is allowed to taste 8 cups of soda, but must assign four to each category "brand X" and "brand Y", so that both the row totals and the column totals are constrained to four. This kind of experiment is complicated to manage, and is almost unknown in practical experiments. 

The operational difference between Barnard’s exact test and Fisher’s ‘exact’ test is how they handle the nuisance parameter(s) of the common success probability, when calculating the  value. Fisher's exact test avoids estimating the nuisance parameter(s) by  conditioning on both margins, an approximately ancillary statistic that  constrains the possible outcomes. Barnard’s test considers all legitimate possible values of the nuisance parameter(s) and chooses the value(s) that maximizes the  value. The theoretical difference between the tests is that Barnard’s test uses the double-binomially distributed, whereas Fisher’s test, because of the conditioning uses is the hypergeometric distribution. However, even when the data come from double-binomial distribution, the conditioning (that leads to using the hypergeometric distribution for calculating the Fisher's exact p-value) produces a valid test.

Both tests are valid, that is, bound the type I error rate at the alpha level. However, Barnard’s test can be more powerful than Fisher’s test because it considers more ‘as or more extreme’ tables, by not conditioning on the second margin, which the procedure for Fisher’s test  ignores. In fact, one variant of Barnard’s test, called Boschloo's test, is uniformly more powerful than Fisher’s test. A more detailed description of Barnard’s test is given by Mehta and Senchaudhuri (2003). Barnard’s test has been used alongside Fisher's exact test in project management research

Criticisms
Under specious pressure from Fisher, Barnard retracted his test in a published paper, however many researchers prefer Barnard’s exact test over Fisher's exact test for analyzing  contingency tables, since its statistics are more powerful for the vast majority of experimental designs, whereas Fisher’s exact test statistics are conservative, meaning the significance shown by its  values are too high, leading the experimenter to dismiss as insignificant results that would be statistically significant using the less conservative double-binomial statistics of Barnard's tests rather than the hypergeometric statistics of Fisher's exact test. Barnard's tests are not appropriate in the rare case of an experimental design that constrains both marginal results (e.g. ‘taste tests’); although rare, experimentally imposed constraints on both marginal totals makes the true sampling distribution for the table  hypergeometric. 

Barnard's test can be applied to larger tables, but the computation time increases and the power advantage quickly decreases. It remains unclear which test statistic is preferred when implementing Barnard's test; however, most test statistics yield uniformly more powerful tests than Fisher's exact test.

See also
 Fisher's exact test
 Boschloo's test

Footnotes

References

External links 
 

Statistical tests for contingency tables